Alexandra Maria Maloney (born 19 March 1992) is a New Zealand sailor.

Maloney is the sister of sailor Andy Maloney. In 2007 in Cagliari, Italy she won a World Championship medal in the Optimist class. Maloney won the 2013 49er FX World Championship and a silver medal at the 2016 Olympics alongside Molly Meech. During the 2015 ISAF Sailing World Cup, Meech and Maloney competed in the women's 49erFX competitions, winning in Miami and coming second in Weymouth. They again won in Miami to start the 2016 season.

References

External links

 
 

Olympic sailors of New Zealand
Living people
New Zealand female sailors (sport)
1992 births
Sailors at the 2016 Summer Olympics – 49er FX
Olympic silver medalists for New Zealand
49er FX class world champions
420 class world champions
World champions in sailing for New Zealand
49er FX class sailors
420 class sailors
29er class sailors
Olympic medalists in sailing
Medalists at the 2016 Summer Olympics
Sailors at the 2020 Summer Olympics – 49er FX